Xiamara Sophia "Xia" Bernardo Vigor (born 23 June 2009) is a British-Filipino child actress and TV host in the Philippines. She was the first grand winner of It's Showtime's segment, Mini Me 2 as mini Selena Gomez. She was the main co-host of It's Showtime's segment, "Xia and Kuys" with co-hosts Vhong Navarro and Billy Crawford. She rose to fame after joining Your Face Sounds Familiar: Kids (season 1) and for impersonating American singer-songwriter Taylor Swift.
Xia is the first Child Ambassador of Save the Children Philippines, Kid Ambassador of Habitat for Humanity Philippines, and a WWF Youth Advocate. She is also the youngest Box Office Queen in the Philippines given by the 51st GMMSF Box-Office Entertainment Awards.

Filmography

Television

Film

Awards

References

External links
 Facebook
 Instagram
 TikTok

2009 births
Living people
People from Exmouth
Filipino child actresses
English child actresses
Filipino people of English descent
English people of Filipino descent
Star Magic